Vanduvancheri is a village in the Kumbakonam taluk of Thanjavur district, Tamil Nadu, India.

Demographics 
At the 2001 census, Vanduvancheri had a total population of 442 with 214 males and 228 females. The sex ratio was 1065. The literacy rate was 80.2%.

References 

Villages in Thanjavur district